The Parkers is an American television sitcom, created by Ralph Farquhar, Sara V. Finney and Vida Spears, and produced by Big Ticket Television for UPN. A spin-off from Moesha, the series stars Mo'Nique and Countess Vaughn as Nikki and Kim Parker, a mother and daughter, who incidentally begin to attend Santa Monica College. It also features Mari Morrow, Jenna von Oÿ, Ken L., Yvette Wilson and Dorien Wilson.

Series overview

Episodes

Season 1 (1999–2000)

Season 2 (2000–01)

Season 3 (2001–02)

Season 4 (2002–03)

Season 5 (2003–04)

References

External links
 
 

Lists of American sitcom episodes